Hoselaw Loch and Din Moss is a nature reserve near Kelso in the Scottish Borders area of Scotland, in the former Roxburghshire.

The reserve is designated SSSI, SPA and Ramsar because of the large numbers of geese overwintering there, especially the Icelandic/Greenland pink-footed goose (Anser brachyrhynchus) and the Icelandic greylag goose (Anser anser).

See also
List of Sites of Special Scientific Interest in Berwickshire and Roxburgh
List of Sites of Special Scientific Interest in Tweeddale and Ettrick and Lauderdale
Special Protection Area, SPA
Joint Nature Conservation Committee
List of places in the Scottish Borders
List of places in Scotland

References

External links
Scottish Wildlife Trust: Hoselaw Loch and Din Moss
Joint Nature Conservation Committee (JNCC) citation
RCAHMS record of Hoselaw Loch

Sites of Special Scientific Interest in Scotland
Special Protection Areas in Scotland
Ramsar sites in Scotland
Lochs of the Scottish Borders
Nature reserves in Scotland
Protected areas in the Scottish Borders